Óscar Serrano González (born October 12, 1973, in Madrid) is a vision impaired T12/B2 track and field athlete from Spain. He competed in the 2000 Summer Paralympics, winning a bronze medal in the T12 1,500 meter race.

Serrano competed in the 2000 Summer Paralympics where he competed in the 1500m and won a bronze in the 5000m.

References

External links 
 

Paralympic athletes of Spain
Athletes (track and field) at the 2000 Summer Paralympics
Paralympic bronze medalists for Spain
Living people
1973 births
Athletes from Madrid
Visually impaired long-distance runners
Spanish disability athletes
Spanish male long-distance runners
Male competitors in athletics with disabilities
Medalists at the 2000 Summer Paralympics
Paralympic medalists in athletics (track and field)
Paralympic long-distance runners